Lullaby Land is a Silly Symphonies animated Disney short film released in 1933. The quilt from Lullaby Land inspired the garden section of the Storybook Land Canal Boats ride at Disneyland California.

Plot
A sleepy infant finds himself transported from his cradle to the "Lullaby Land of Nowhere", a dreamland where pacifiers grow on trees; diapers, bottles, and potty chairs march on parade; and the baby's stuffed gingham dog comes to life.  He wanders into the "forbidden garden", containing such things as scissors, knives, and fountain pens that the baby "mustn't touch."  He callously smashes watches with hammers and plays with giant matches. The burning matches chase after him.  The baby and his dog escape across a pond, using a huge bar of soap as a raft, but the smoke from the matches turns into boogeymen, who chase him before vanishing.  The benevolent Sandman, dressed as a wizard, spots the baby hiding and works his magic, sending him to sleep in his own cradle at home.

Voice cast
 Girl trio: The Rhythmettes (including Mary Moder, Beatrice Hagen and Dorothy Compton)
 Bogey Men: The Three Rhythm Kings
 Sandman: George Gramlich

Home media
The short was released on December 4, 2001, on Walt Disney Treasures: Silly Symphonies - The Historic Musical Animated Classics.

References

External links
 

1933 films
1933 short films
1930s Disney animated short films
Films directed by Wilfred Jackson
Films produced by Walt Disney
Silly Symphonies
1933 animated films
Films set in a fictional country
Films scored by Frank Churchill
Films scored by Leigh Harline
American black-and-white films
Sandman in film
1930s American films